Botany is a suburb in the Eastern Suburbs of Sydney, in the state of New South Wales, Australia. Botany is located 11 kilometres south of the Sydney central business district and is part of the Bayside Council.

Botany sits on the northern shore of Botany Bay, east of Sydney Airport, adjacent to the suburbs of Mascot, Banksmeadow, Pagewood and Port Botany.

History

Botany Bay, to the south, is where Captain James Cook first landed on 29 April 1770, when navigating his way around Australia on his ship, the Endeavour. The ship's English botanist Joseph Banks and Swedish assistant botanist Daniel Solander, spent several days on shore collecting vast numbers of specimens, that were previously unknown in Europe. Cook's journals first referred to the bay as Sting Rays' Harbour, then later Botanist Bay and finally both these names were crossed out and replaced with Botany Bay. The suburb name comes from the bay it stands on.

Botany was originally planned as an agricultural district, in the same way the surrounding suburbs were used for market gardens. However, it became an industrial area with fellmongers yards and slaughter works. In 1809, Mr E Redmond was one of the first to settle here and Simeon Lord (1771–1840) was an important developer in the area who built a fulling mill in 1815. In 1823 he was granted  and more grants followed. Part of his estate was subdivided in 1859 to create the Booralee Township and the rest was subdivided in 1887. The Sydney Waterworks were established in Botany in 1858.

The Sir Joseph Banks Hotel was a popular hotel on the shores of Botany Bay. By 1850, a private zoo had been established there and visitors could go horse riding, play cricket and football. International athletes challenged the locals in the Sir Joseph Banks Handicap on the racetrack. In 1988, the Sir Joseph Banks Pleasure Gardens were refurbished with local industry contributions. The racing track was restored and an annual event called the Botany Bay Gift attracted international athletes again. The hotel, which was built in stages from 1840, is now listed on the Register of the National Estate. The other historic landmark in the area is St Matthew's Church of England, on the corner of Botany Road and Lord Street. It was built in 1862 and is now on the Register of the National Estate.

Former tram line service

The city line to Botany opened in 1882 as a steam tramway, with electric services commencing in 1903. The service from Circular Quay initially via Elizabeth, Chalmers and Redfern Streets (from 1902), then in 1933 via Pitt and Castlereagh Streets, and Eddy Avenue, Lee and Regents Streets, to Botany Street in Waterloo. A single-track connection along Bourke and O'Dea Streets joined at the present day Green Square, allowing access to the Dowling Street Depot. The line then passed down the entire length of Botany Road to Botany.

In Mascot, a branch led to the former Ascot Racecourse at the site of Sydney Airport. Points were provided at Bay Street on Botany Road in Botany, for short working. The line was double track throughout. From Botany, a single-track line crossed the Botany Goods railway at Beauchamp Road, then passed along Perry Street and Bunnerong Road, past the former Bunnerong Power Station to join the La Perouse line at Yarra Junction. Generally a shuttle service operated on this single track section between Botany and La Perouse. This single-track line was cut back to Military Road in 1935. The line from the junctions at Cleveland Street to Botany closed in 1960. Sydney Buses route 309 generally follows the route.

Heritage listings 
Botany has a number of heritage-listed sites, including:
 23 Anniversary Street: Old Sir Joseph Banks Hotel
 2 Banksia Street: Botany Post Office

Demographics
According to the 2021 census of Population, there were 12,960 people in Botany.
 Aboriginal and Torres Strait Islander people made up 1.9% of the population.
 The most common ancestries were Australian 25.7%, English 25.5%, Irish 12.7%, Chinese 8% and Scottish 7.1%.
 62.9% of people were born in Australia. The next most common countries of birth were England 3.4%, New Zealand 2.4%, China 2.3% and Philippines 2.2%.
 69.6% of people spoke only English at home. Other languages spoken at home included Mandarin 3.0%, Greek 1.9%, Spanish 2.0%, Indonesian 1.6% and Cantonese 1.4%. 
 The most common responses for religion were Catholic 34.2%, No Religion 29.8% and Anglican 8.8%.

Commercial area
Port Botany is the site of Sydney's major port and as such, Botany is a suburb with extensive commercial development centred on shipping and freight. Botany also has a large chemical production facility owned by several companies including Huntsman and Orica (previously ICI). The plant was built in the 1940s and has been owned by Orica since 1997. The plant once manufactured paints, plastics and industrial chemicals such as solvents, and is responsible for a large groundwater plume of pollution in the area. The main shopping centre in Botany runs along Botany Road.

Sir Joseph Banks Park
Sir Joseph Banks Park comprises Foreshore Reserve and the Sir Joseph Banks Pleasure Gardens. Foreshore Reserve is 28 hectares of bushland on land reclaimed from Botany Bay. The Reserve features walking tracks through sand dunes to protected wetlands, formed around a network of ponds. The Pleasure Gardens reflect the history of the area with a zoo playground featuring life size animal statues, a mosaic depicting Banks's journey, decorative flag terrace, Banksia garden and the central oval running track.  A statue of Sir Joseph Banks examining botanical specimens is located in the pleasure gardens.

Sport and recreation
A number of well-known sporting teams represent the local area. One of them is the well known NRL club named the South Sydney Rabbitohs and Botany Rams some other teams are Pagewood Botany Soccer Club, Botany Golf Club, Bonnie Doon Golf Club, Eastlake Golf Club and The Lakes Golf Club. Lady Robinsons Beach is a prominent beach in the area.

Housing
Botany features low density housing and increasingly medium density developments, particularly terraces and small apartment buildings. This increase in development in Botany has been as a result of increased urbanisation, with the redevelopment of industrial areas, allowing developers to take advantage of the proximity to beaches and CBD.

Schools
Botany Public School is located in Botany Road. The original schoolroom is a small brick building with Gothic influences, built in 1868.

References

External links
  [CC-By-SA]
  [CC-By-SA]

 
Suburbs of Sydney